Milan Perić (Serbian Cyrillic: Милан Перић; born 16 April 1986) is a former Serbian professional footballer who played as a striker.

Club career
On 5 July 2008, Perić signed a four-year contract with Partizan, receiving the number 9 shirt. He only made four appearances for the club, including one domestic league appearance (against Rad), one Serbian Cup appearance (against Mladost Apatin), one UEFA Cup appearance (against Timișoara), and one friendly against PAOK, scoring a goal in a 1–3 loss. In early 2009, Perić was loaned to fellow top division club Jagodina on a six-month deal.

International career
Perić made five appearances for Serbia at under-21 level between 2007 and 2008.

Statistics

Honours
Ferencváros
 Ligakupa: 2012–13
Videoton
 Szuperkupa: 2012

References

External links
 
 
 

Serbian footballers
Association football forwards
Dunaújváros PASE players
Expatriate footballers in Bosnia and Herzegovina
Expatriate footballers in China
Expatriate footballers in Greece
Expatriate footballers in Hungary
Expatriate footballers in Ukraine
Ferencvárosi TC footballers
FK TSC Bačka Topola players
FK Bežanija players
FK Hajduk Kula players
FK Jagodina players
FK Mladi Radnik players
FK Mladost Lučani players
FK Mladost Velika Obarska players
FK Metalac Gornji Milanovac players
FK Partizan players
Football League (Greece) players
Kaposvári Rákóczi FC players
Nemzeti Bajnokság I players
Panegialios F.C. players
Pécsi MFC players
Premier League of Bosnia and Herzegovina players
SC Tavriya Simferopol players
FK Zvezdara players
FK BSK Borča players
Serbia under-21 international footballers
Serbian expatriate footballers
Serbian expatriate sportspeople in Bosnia and Herzegovina
Serbian expatriate sportspeople in China
Serbian expatriate sportspeople in Greece
Serbian expatriate sportspeople in Hungary
Serbian expatriate sportspeople in Ukraine
Serbian First League players
Serbian SuperLiga players
Sportspeople from Čačak
Fehérvár FC players
1986 births
Living people